The 1921 Duquesne Dukes football team represented Duquesne University during the 1921 college football season. The head coach was Jake Stahl, coaching his second season with the Dukes.

Schedule

References

Duquesne
Duquesne Dukes football seasons
College football winless seasons
Duquesne Dukes football